Bad City was a five-piece rock band from Chicago, Illinois. They were signed to Atlantic Records in 2010. The band released their debut album Welcome to the Wasteland, produced by Grammy Award nominated producer Johnny K, on August 24, 2010.

History

While technically formed in early 2010, the evolution of the group began in 2008 when Chicago-based band Powerspace, including members Kevin Kane and Tom Schleiter, recruited Chicago natives Max Perenchio and Jake Serek as touring musicians. Just before the breakup of Powerspace, Perenchio and Schleiter began writing songs together for a new project. Temecula, California vocalist Josh Caddy soon finalized the lineup which became known as Bad City. The band takes its name from its experiences writing and recording the album in an unfavorable neighborhood in the west side of Chicago. Explained in an interview, "We were chased by gangs, constantly harassed by the dead-looking street people, even the kids out there are nasty. Don’t get me wrong, I love the city, but it is a bad city."  

After completion of their debut album, the band gained the attention of Billy Corgan of the Smashing Pumpkins. Describing the band as a "super fresh take on the Rock", Corgan invited the band onto the Smashing Pumpkins 2010 Summer Rock 'n' Roll Party tour. In August 2010, KISS frontman Paul Stanley noticed the band's song "Call Paul Stanley" and further endorsed the band, calling their album "an absolute knockout and the best album I've heard in ages. A killer, cohesive album of great rock and bombastic production that has been sorely missing. Every track is a winner and Bad City raises the bar out of most band's reach. It's really that good". After a midwest tour with Hinder, the band continued supporting "Welcome to the Wasteland" on another tour with The Smashing Pumpkins, followed by Canadian and West Coast shows with Slash.

Bad City performed the theme song, "Fight as One", for the Marvel Entertainment animated television series, The Avengers: Earth's Mightiest Heroes.

In June 2011, vocalist Josh Caddy left the band.  He was replaced on tour by former Powerspace vocalist, Alec Cyganowski.

Bad City Performed on the inaugural "KISS KRUISE" in October 2011 aboard the Carnival Destiny. Strangely enough, the band did not perform their hit "Take Me For A Ride".

In December 2011, Bad City played a farewell show in Chicago.

Currently, guitar player Tom Schleiter is living in L.A., successfully producing, writing, and mixing music at his studio: STUDIO AMERICA under the pseudonym 'Tommy English'.  Drummer Kevin Kane is pursuing his Ph.D. in Comparative Literature at The University at Buffalo. Jake Serek plays in a band called The Gold Web.

Max Perenchio died in a single-vehicle car crash on 26 November 2020, aged 33.

Musical Style
Bad City is praised for its anachronistic mixture of various rock genres including 70s KISS and Alice Cooper inspired hard rock, ambitious 90s alternative rock such as Smashing Pumpkins and Soundgarden, 80s-style sleaze metal, 2000-era riff-rock oriented bands such as The White Stripes, and power pop a la Cheap Trick . Regarding influences, Caddy said, "We took influences from all our favorite bands which happen to be from different decades, modernized it and brought it to a new level." Upon the release of Welcome to the Wasteland many critics pinned the band as hair metal, Perenchio responded, "I think it’s a semantic issue. I think people hear harmonized guitar solos, big hooks, and gang vocals and quickly assume Hair Metal for convenience sake. It's just a label, it's not a big deal. When I think of Hair Metal I think of a very cookie-cutter period that lifted the aesthetic value of Ratt’s Out of the Cellar and drove it into the depths of decadence. I don’t really associate Bad City with that, and our hair isn’t nearly big enough."

Members
Josh Caddy - Lead Vocals
Tom Schleiter - Guitar
Kevin Kane - Drums
Jake Serek - Bass
Max Perenchio - Guitar

Discography

Albums
2010: Welcome to the Wasteland (release date: Tuesday, August 24, 2010)(album) U.S. No. 182

References

External links
 
 Bad City on atlanticrecords.com

Atlantic Records artists
Hard rock musical groups from Illinois
Musical groups from Chicago
Musical groups disestablished in 2011